South Decatur Junior-Senior High School is a middle school and high school located in Greensburg, Indiana.

Athletics
While the majority of sports at South Decatur Junior-Senior High School compete in the Mid-Hoosier Conference, the football program competes in the Mid-Indiana Football Conference.

Construction on the South Decatur building began in 1967.  The school first opened in 1968.  The school was created as a merger of the Jackson Township School, Sand Creek School and Burney School.  In May 1968, the student council met and decided on maroon and white as the school colors and that the nickname would be the Cougars.  A.C. Graber was the first principal of South Decatur and the gymnasium was dedicated on October 27, 1968.

See also
 List of high schools in Indiana
 North Decatur Junior-Senior High School
 Mid-Hoosier Conference
 Mid-Indiana Football Conference
 Greensburg, Indiana

References

External links
Official Website
 

Public high schools in Indiana
Buildings and structures in Decatur County, Indiana
1968 establishments in Indiana